Promises is a 2021 studio album by the British electronic musician Floating Points, the American jazz saxophonist Pharoah Sanders and the London Symphony Orchestra. It was released on 26 March 2021 through the New York label Luaka Bop. It consists of a single 46-minute composition noted for its "dreamlike" quality. The album has received acclaim from music critics. Promises was the final album Sanders released before his death in 2022.

Background and recording 
Sam Shepherd, a British DJ, musician and producer, has produced numerous projects in the field of electronic music under the name Floating Points. The previous Floating Points album, Crush, was released in 2019. For Pharoah Sanders, Promises was the only studio album he released in over a decade, before his death the next year.

Sanders became aware of Shepherd's work in 2015 when he was impressed by the debut Floating Points album Elaenia. Sanders was 75 years old at the time. He later befriended Shepherd, who is 40 years his junior, over lunch and, eventually, proposed that the two of them produce a collaborative album. Shepherd composed the music and played numerous electronic and non-electronic instruments. He further enlisted the London Symphony Orchestra to perform arrangements he had written. The album was primarily recorded at Sargent Recorders in Los Angeles, California in the summer of 2019. The strings were recorded by the London Symphony Orchestra at AIR Studios in London in the summer of 2020, during the COVID-19 pandemic. The orchestra included violins, violas, cellos, and double basses.

Composition 

Promises has been called an ambient record, noted for its "dreamlike" quality. The album consists of a single musical composition written by Sam Shepherd, divided into nine movements. The piece begins with its central motif: a short pattern of notes played by Shepherd on synthesiser, piano and harpsichord. The motif is repeated throughout the piece in variations. It is compounded with a sparse backdrop of synthetic arrangements from Shepherd, particularly synthesiser. The background is also populated by Sanders's atmospheric tenor saxophone passages, which vary in intensity and are positioned sparingly throughout. In the fourth movement, Sanders uses his voice to vocalize wordless passages. Sanders's saxophone concludes its presence at the end of the seventh movement.

String arrangements performed by the London Symphony Orchestra appear in this instrumental conversation between Shepherd and Sanders. In the sixth movement, the strings reach their climax with rising crescendos that overpower the mix; the orchestra then dissipates into the background at the movement's conclusion. Shepherd and Sanders resume their running performance, veering into an "abstract psychedelia" direction. The central motif ultimately fades from the mix during the eighth movement. After a series of false endings, the piece finally concludes with its ninth movement.

The album has been compared to Sanders's 1971 album Black Unity, which similarly consists of a single musical composition. It has been classified as a piece of minimalist composition.

Live performance 
On 20 September 2023, Floating Points will debut Promises for its world-premiere performance at the Hollywood Bowl in Los Angeles. A one-time concert, it will feature guest artists including Shabaka Hutchings, Four Tet, Caribou, and the Los Angeles Studio Orchestra.

Critical reception 

Promises was met with acclaim. At Metacritic, which assigns a normalised rating out of 100 from reviews from professional critics, the album received a score of 86, based on 20 reviews. Aggregator AnyDecentMusic? gave it 8.8 out of 10, based on their assessment of the critical consensus.

Chiara Wilkinson of The Quietus called Promises a "celebration of sound at its finest and most pure: from the smallest scratch to cathartic crescendos, from spiralling improv to contemplative silences. Every note, whisper, bleep, and shift is significant. It is marvellously multifaceted but never obnoxious: a refreshing, one-of-a-kind conversation between jazz, classical, and electronic." Kitty Empire of The Observer gave the album a perfect score, calling it a "breathtaking" album that transcends the collaborators' usual genres. Mark Richardson of Pitchfork called it a "a clear late-career masterpiece" for Sanders. Daniel Sylvester of Exclaim! wrote that Sanders and Shepherd were "so metaphysically in tune with their latest creation that their respective musical personalities almost disappear into the waves of sound, making Promises a recording that is more of a transcending mind meld than it is a collaboration." John Mulvey of Mojo compared the album to Henryk Górecki's symphonies and to Alice Coltrane's World Galaxy, calling it a "subtly sophisticated piece" that "creates space for Sanders to showcase his tender, measured, lyrical phrasing, abstracted scatting and [...] a brief sputtering blast of free saxophone energy that proves, at 80, his fire remains potent. Stephen Dalton of Uncut called it an "impressive collision of talents" but concluded that it was "frustratingly slight" and overall a minor addition to both artists' discographies.

Year-end lists

Track listing 
All tracks are written by Sam Shepherd.

Vinyl edition

CD and digital edition

Personnel 
Credits adapted from the album's liner notes.

Music 
 Sam Shepherd – piano, harpsichord, celesta, Fender Rhodes, Hammond B3, Oberheim 4 voice, Oberheim OB-Xa, Solina String Ensemble, Therevox ET-4.3, EMS Synthi, ARP 2600, Buchla 200e, string writing, string arrangements
 Pharoah Sanders – tenor saxophone, voice
 London Symphony Orchestra – strings
 Sally Herbert – LSO conductor
 Carmine Lauri – LSO lead
 Olli Cunningham – score preparation
 Colin Rae – score preparation

Technical 
 Sam Shepherd – mixing
 Tim Pennells – assistant mixing
 John Prestage – recording (AIR)
 Ashley Andrew-Jones – assistant recording (AIR)
 Gianluca Massimo – assistant recording (AIR)
 Jeremy Murphy – engineering (AIR)
 Sean Cook – engineering (Sargent)
 Chris Bellman – lacquer cut
 Yale Evelev – executive production
 Eric Welles-Nyström – executive production

Artwork 
 Julie Mehretu – cover artwork
 Eric Welles-Nyström – photos in Los Angeles
 Shawn Johnson – photos from London
 Paul Diddy – design, layout

Charts

Weekly charts

Year-end charts

References

External links 
 

2021 albums
Collaborative albums
Floating Points albums
Pharoah Sanders albums
London Symphony Orchestra albums
Luaka Bop albums
Albums recorded at AIR Studios
Ambient albums by English artists
Ambient albums by American artists
Minimal music albums